Coniolepiota is a fungal genus in the family Agaricaceae. The genus is monotypic, containing only a single species, Coniolepiota spongodes. It was first described from Thailand, and later also reported from Bangladesh and China.

See also
 List of Agaricaceae genera
 List of Agaricales genera

References

Agaricaceae
Taxa described in 1887
Monotypic Agaricales genera
Fungi of Asia
Fungi of Bangladesh
Taxa named by Miles Joseph Berkeley